La Yongma Ri s a mountain peak located at  above sea level in the southern main ridge of the Saltoro Mountains, a sub-range of the Karakorum.

Location 

The peak is located in the disputed border region between Pakistan's Gilgit-Baltistan territory and the Indian administered Ladakh region to the southwest of the Siachen Glacier. The so-called "Line of Control" runs about 4 km north of the summit. Its west flank drains south to the Shyok, while the east flank lies in the Nubra River Basin.

The K12 (mountain) at 32 km north-northwest, forms the dominance reference point.

References 

Mountains of the Transhimalayas
Six-thousanders of the Transhimalayas
Mountains of Ladakh